Dar Bagh (also Romanized as Dar Bāgh; also known as Darreh Bāgh and Deh Bāgh) is a village in Madvarat Rural District, in the Central District of Shahr-e Babak County, Kerman Province, Iran. At the 2006 census, its population was 74, in 21 families.

References 

Populated places in Shahr-e Babak County